, is one of the original 40 throws of Judo as developed by Jigoro Kano. It belongs to the second group,
Dai Nikyo, of the traditional throwing list, Gokyo (no waza), of Kodokan Judo. It is also part of the current 67 Throws of Kodokan Judo.
It is classified as a hip technique, Koshi-waza.

Technique description 
In Koshi Guruma the attacker tries to force his opponent to bend down a little and thereby be able to hold his right arm around the opponents head. This is no problem against smaller opponents. During this process he wheels his right hip inwards a bit past the opponents right hip. The legs follow in a series of steps during this wheel and in the new position the attacker simply bends over a bit, thereby lifting the opponent from the ground. The last step is then to rotate the body clockwise as this move throws the opponent to the ground.
The attacker can choose to follow into the throw and, if done properly, positions himself directly into Kesa-gatame.

Technique history 
Koshi Guruma has been a throw taught by Judo traditionalists since Kano Sensei. Recently, in certain countries such as Canada, Koshi Guruma is frowned upon because of its potential risk of neck injury. It is still taught at a yellow or orange belt level, but banned in some tournaments.

Included systems 
Systems:
Kodokan Judo, Judo Lists
Lists:
The Canon Of Judo
Judo technique

Similar techniques, variants, and aliases 
Similar techniques

 1/2 hip throw: uki goshi
 2/2 hip throw: o goshi
 3/2 hip throw: koshi guruma

English aliases:
Hip wheel

External links
 An animated Koshi Guruma lesson

Judo technique
Throw (grappling)